Puntius burmanicus is a species of cyprinid fish endemic to Myanmar and only known from Mergui. It grows to  TL.

References 

Puntius
Endemic fauna of Myanmar
Fish of Myanmar
Taxa named by Francis Day
Fish described in 1878
Barbs (fish)